Clonia (Hemiclonia) melanoptera, the giant black-winged clonia, is a species of predatory bush crickets in the subfamily Saginae. It is found in South Africa.

See also
 Coleoptera in the 10th edition of Systema Naturae
 List of least concern insects

References

External links

 
 
 Clonia melanoptera at gbif.org

Tettigoniidae
Insects described in 1758
Taxa named by Carl Linnaeus
Fauna of South Africa
Orthoptera of Africa